The Belgian National Geographic Institute (NGI); is the Belgian national mapping agency.

The headquarters are located at Campus Renaissance near the Cinquantenaire park in Brussels.

See also
(List of) national mapping agencies

External links
NGI / IGN official website

National mapping agencies
Geography of Belgium
Government of Belgium